Big Brother 2016 is the sixth season of the Big Brother Croatia and eighth season of Big Brother franchise overall to air on RTL. The show premiered on April 17, 2016 on RTL. Marijana Batinić hosting the main shows.

Housemates

Thirteen housemates, including the host of Big Brother 1 Neno Pavinčić, entered the house on Day 1. After the first eviction, they were joined by Alen (third place in Big Brother 1) and Rina (from Big Brother 5).

Nominations Table

Notes

 Since entering the Big Brother house, Neno is on a secret mission. If his viral video collected more than ten thousand views, he can leave the house and become the host of Big Brother. Neno completed his mission and left on Day 3.
 Only Fabio and Rina have passed this week's laser maze task. During the live show, they can open a safe by using the code in a letter they won. Fabio won immunity before this week's eviction result was announced. Rina won a place in the finale.
 Marina is directly nominated as a housemate discovered her offer that was supposed to be secret.
 The public was voting for the housemate they wanted to win. Following the first vote count, Rina and Fabio finished fifth place and fourth place. Romano crowned the winner. But the production didn't announce who finished third place and second place.

References

External links
 Official website

2016 Croatian television seasons
Big Brother (Croatian TV series)
Croatia